William Ferry (born 7 December 2000) is a professional footballer who plays for Cheltenham Town, as a full-back.

Club career
Born in Bury, Ferry spent his early career with Bury and Southampton, turning professional in 2017. He signed a new two-year contract with Southampton in August 2021 and immediately moved on loan to Crawley Town.

In August 2022 he signed for Cheltenham Town on a two-year contract.

International career
Ferry is a Republic of Ireland under-19 and under-21 international player.

Career statistics

References

2000 births
Living people
English people of Irish descent
English footballers
Republic of Ireland association footballers
Bury F.C. players
Southampton F.C. players
Crawley Town F.C. players
Cheltenham Town F.C. players
English Football League players
Association football fullbacks
Republic of Ireland youth international footballers
Republic of Ireland under-21 international footballers